Carl Frauenstein (born 23 October 1985 in Auckland) is a New Zealand cricketer who plays for the Canterbury Wizards in the State Shield.

Carl spends his winter months playing cricket at Aberdeenshire Cricket Club in Scotland, where he helped the Strathmore Union side to the Premier Division Championship in 2008.  Here, he has affectionately been nicknamed "Thunderbrow", due to his larger than life eyebrows.

He is returning to the club for the 2009 season.

External links

1985 births
Living people
New Zealand cricketers
Canterbury cricketers